Puerto Rico Air Management Services (PRAMS) is an Air Charter and cargo operator based out of the Miami International Airport. The airline was founded in 2005. Its operating certificate allows it to fly to the USA, the entire Caribbean (including Cuba) and South America. At one point, the company also had a then-unique operating permit, that allowed it to operate flights from the United States mainland to Cuba, operating charter flights that usually carry excess baggage and other cargo for companies that arranged these unique flights leaving the Miami International Airport to the otherwise U.S. embargoed Caribbean island.

Fleet 

Cessna 210

Accident & Incidents 

On November 11, 2015, a Cessna Cargo Configuration was added to certificate(C-210). No injuries were reported.

References

Air Charter Guide

External links

Official Website

2005 establishments in Puerto Rico
Transportation in San Juan, Puerto Rico
Airlines of Puerto Rico
Puerto Rican brands